The Eidsivating Court of Appeal is one of six courts of appeal in the Kingdom of Norway. The Court is located in the city of Hamar. The court has jurisdiction over the counties of Innlandet and eastern Viken. These areas constitute the Eidsivating judicial district. This court can rule on both civil and criminal cases that are appealed from one of its subordinate district courts. Court decisions can be, to a limited extent, appealed to the Supreme Court of Norway. The chief judicial officer of the court is currently Nina Sollie.  The court is administered by the Norwegian National Courts Administration.

Location
The Court has its seat in the town of Hamar. Additionally, the Court permanently sits in the towns of Gjøvik, Lillehammer, and Eidsvoll. The Court may also sit in other places within its jurisdiction as needed.

Jurisdiction
This court accepts appeals from all of the district courts from its geographic jurisdiction. This court is divided into judicial regions and there is one or more district courts that belongs to each of these regions.

History
In the middle ages, the old Eidsivating was a thing for Eastern Norway. The Eidsivating was the court system used for centuries in Norway. In 1797, the court system was changed and the old things were dissolved. In 1890, the court system was changed again to the modern version. A new Eidsivating Court of Appeal was established on 1 January 1890, but it only lasted for two years. In 1892, it was merged into the Eidsiva- og Frostating Court of Appeal. Then on 1 July 1936, a new Eidsivating Court of Appeal was established for most of Eastern Norway. On 1 January 1995, the Eidsivating Court of Appeal was divided. The southwestern part of the old court's jurisdictional area became the new Borgarting Court of Appeal and the northeastern part retained the old Eidsivating Court of Appeal name. On 26 April 2021, the Storting approved moving the areas of eastern Viken county from the Borgarting court to the Eidsivating court.

Judges
In 1988, Wilhelm Omsted was appointed as the presiding judge. He served as presiding judge from 1988 until 1995 when he became the new presiding judge of the Borgarting Court of Appeal.

References

External links
 Official site 

Courts of appeal of Norway
Organisations based in Hamar
1890 establishments in Norway
1892 disestablishments in Norway
1936 establishments in Norway
1995 establishments in Norway